Captain Bertram Sutton Evans, MVO (17 December 1872 – 2 March 1919) was an officer of the British Royal Navy and cricketer.

Cricket
Evans, a right-handed batsman, made his first-class debut in the 1900 County Championship for Hampshire against Warwickshire. Evans played one further match for Hampshire in the 1900 season against Sussex.

Nine years later Evans returned to play for Hampshire in the 1909 season, playing his first match on his return against the touring Australians. Evans played two matches for the club in that year's County Championship against Derbyshire and Middlesex.

Naval career
Evans joined the Royal Navy. In September 1902, he was posted to the Naval School of Telegraphy at HMS Victory for signals course, and from 12 November 1902 he was posted as 1st lieutenant on the battleship HMS Venerable on her first commission, to the Mediterranean Fleet.

Evans died in Paris, France on 2 March 1919.

References

External links
Bertram Evans at Cricinfo
Bertram Evans at CricketArchive
Bertram Sutton Evans at The Dreadnought Project.

1872 births
1919 deaths
People from Godalming
People from Surrey
English cricketers
Hampshire cricketers
Royal Navy officers of World War I
British military personnel killed in World War I
Military personnel from Surrey